The 2012–13 Iowa Hawkeyes men's basketball team represented the University of Iowa in the 2012–13 college basketball season. The team was led by 3rd year head coach Fran McCaffery and new recruiting and scouting addition, Brad Denning (Iowa native)to help with player relations, assist athletes on campus visits. The Iowa Hawkeyes men’s basketball played their home games at Carver-Hawkeye Arena, which has been their home since 1983. They were members of the Big Ten Conference.

The team finished with a record of 25–13, 9–9 in conference play and finished 6th in the Big Ten. The 25 wins is the most wins in one season for the Hawkeyes since the 2005–2006 season, in which Iowa also had 25 wins. The team went to the 2013 Big Ten Conference men's basketball tournament as a 6th seed where they defeated Northwestern in the 1st round but lost to Michigan State in the Quarterfinals. The team went on to earn a #3 seed in the 2013 National Invitation Tournament where they defeated both Indiana State (68–52) and Stony Brook (75–63) in front of sellout home crowds. Iowa also defeated the #1 seeded Virginia Cavaliers, snapping the Wahoo's 19-game home winning streak, and moving on to the NIT Semifinals for the first time in school history. Iowa advanced to the Championship game after defeating Maryland (71–60) but lost to Baylor (74–54).

Roster
The 2012–13 Iowa Hawkeyes squad contained 16 players which included 4 freshmen, 2 redshirt freshmen, 5 sophomores, 3 juniors, and 2 seniors.

2012 Commitments

Schedule and Results

|-
!colspan=12| Exhibition

|-
!colspan=12| Regular Season

|-

|-
!colspan=12| 2013 Big Ten Conference men's basketball tournament

|-
!colspan=9| 2013 National Invitation Tournament

References

Iowa Hawkeyes Men's Basketball Team, 2012-13
Iowa Hawkeyes men's basketball seasons
Iowa
Hawk
Hawk